Merrylands High School is a coeducational, comprehensive high school in Merrylands, a suburb in Western Sydney, New South Wales, Australia. 

The school has an enrolment of 800 students; 62% of students come from language backgrounds other than English and over 50 cultures are represented at the school. The school's current principal is Amika Prasad. The school was established in 1959.

Notable alumni 
 Musician Rick Springfield attended Merrylands High School briefly during the 1960s.
 Fadi Ibrahim attended Merrylands High School during the 1980s.
 Dr Connie Katelaris attended Merrylands High School from 1964 to 1969. Connie is a Professor of Immunology & Allergy, University of Western Sydney and Head of Department and Senior Staff Specialist at Campbelltown Hospital. She also has a busy private consultant practice at Westmead. Connie is past president of the Australasian Society of Clinical Immunology and Allergy, an immediate past president of the Asian Pacific Association of Allergology, Asthma and Clinical Immunology, and she has held executive positions on the World Allergy Organisation Board.
 Ian Boardman attended Merrylands High School from 1964 to 1969. Ian is currently a consultant and is a Former Queensland Public Advocate, Former Regional Director at Anti Discrimination Commission of Queensland, Former Director at Indigenous Social Health, Former Director at First National Mental Health Strategy. Ian studied Counselling at University of Canberra and Politics at University of Sydney
 Ingrid Tartu attended Merrylands High School from 1964 to 1969. Ingrid is a Member of the Board of the Estonian Cultural Foundation of Australia. Her professional qualifications include: Registered Nurse (RAHC), Dip OHS (ACQC), Dip PM (ACPM), Master of Nursing (UTAS), Clinical Fellow, Joanna Briggs Institute (JBI), Grad Cert Research (UTAS), Sigma Theta Tau International Honor Society of Nursing (STTI).
 Stephen Treloar attended Merrylands High School from 1964 to 1969. Stephen is a Executive-Coach, Mentor & Business-Coach, and he is a lecturer at the University of Notre Dame Australia in the School of Business. Stephen holds a Doctorate of Business Administration. His publications include How Learning Styles Predict Charitableness via Emotional Management, Expatriate Management - An ANZAC Mentality, and Silverstone Industries Ltd: Whistle-blowing – A case study of actual events in a leading Australian charity. 
 Bogdan (Bill, William) Zubrycki attended Merrylands High School from 1964 to 1969. Bill played for Parramatta NSWRFL in 1973 against Robert Fulton and Graeme Langlands.

References

Public high schools in Sydney
1959 establishments in Australia
Educational institutions established in 1959